Odisha Sahitya Akademi is an institution established in 1957 in Odisha for the active promotion of Odia language and literature. It was created as an autonomous literary organisation. In 1970 it was converted into a society.

Activities
The organisation carries out various activities for promotion of Odia language and literature. Chief among them are as below.

Publications
The organisation publishes Books in Odia, Translations of literature from Odia and vice versa ,and periodicals for promotion of Odia language.

Prizes
The Akademi awards the following prizes in various categories of literature.

 Atibadi Jagannath Das Samman
Started in 1993, this prize is awarded for lifetime contribution to Odia literature.
Odisha Sahitya Akademi Puraskar

This prize is awarded for outstanding contribution to Odia literature in various categories.

Promotion of literature
 Organisation Literary symposium
 It supplies books to school and college libraries.
 It organises literary workshops at various places both inside and outside Odisha.

See also
 Sahitya Akademi

References

External links
 Official Website of Odisha Sahitya Akademi

1957 establishments in Orissa